Deer Valley High School in Antioch, California, is a public secondary school serving southeast Antioch in Contra Costa County, California. It opened in 1996

In 2007, the Antioch Unified School District named Scott Bergerhouse and Clarence Isadore co-principals. The co-principal model has previously been implemented in some larger schools in southern California.

In February 2010, Deer Valley and the rest of the AUSD schools were informed that they would issue a uniform policy in the second semester of the 2010-2011 school year. This policy proved to be a failure for the school, partly due to the policy taking effect halfway through the year. The policy was discontinued by its second month.

School Site Council

The Deer Valley School Site Council is a group of parents, teachers, students and other school employees elected by their peers to meet with the school co-principals in order to:
 Develop a comprehensive school site plan
 Plan, monitor, and review its effectiveness
 Develop a budget aligned to categorical program funds
 Review and revise the plan and budget annually
 Recommend Single Plan for Student Achievement to the School Board
 Recommend the plan for targeting use of other categorical or supplemental funds to the School Board
 Ensure that the school is continually engaged in identifying and implementing curriculum and instructional practices

Academics

The school is divided into four "houses", each of which has its own vice-principal and secretary. At the freshman and sophomore levels Deer Valley uses a teaming concept, where groups of students share the same English, math, science, and history teacher. In addition to core classes, a wide variety of elective classes are offered to students.  In addition to instrumental and choral music, foreign language, drama, automotive, culinary, and art classes, students may also enroll in electives including video production, digital art, web design, animation, law, manufacturing, photography, and careers with children.

Deer Valley also houses academies: Antioch Unified School District has four Linked Learning academies in place throughout the district. There are four academies on the campus of Deer Valley High School, a Law Academy, a Performing Arts Academy, a Business Academy, and an ACE Academy.

The process for attending an academy begins in the second half of the eighth grade, when students and their parents have opportunities to attend presentations by each of the Learning Link academies. Students can apply for one or more by completing an application. The selection is by lottery; it is open to all district students without pre-testing; however, there is a 3.0 GPA requirement.

Located in House 2 of DVHS, the Law Academy curriculum includes three elements: law-related content embedded in required courses in English, social studies, math and science, law-specific elective courses such as Constitutional Law and Criminal Justice, and work-based learning throughout the four years of study. 

Students enrolled in the Deer Valley Law Academy must take a fundamental criminal justice class in 9th grade, with the curriculum continuing on to the next year, and psychology in 11th grade. Deer Valley is also one of the few high schools in California with the option to take Philosophy; the Law students are placed as top priority in the enrollment process.

DVHS Planetarium

Deer Valley High School is one of the few high schools in the Bay Area to have a planetarium.  The planetarium has been in operation since 2004 and hosts biweekly shows for the community. It is open to the public. The current shows start at 8 pm and has star observing at 9 pm on alternating Thursdays when school is in session.

Departments

 Career Technology (including the Law Academy which opened in the 2009-10 school year)
 English
 Mathematics
 Physical Education
 Reform Facilitators
 Science
 Social Science
 Special Education
 Visual and Performing Arts
 World Languages

Incidents

2009 shooting

On September 16, 2009, at about 8:29am, a 16-year-old student of Deer Valley High School was shot in the arm and chest near the school. The shots were fired from a vehicle, which then drove off. The victim was lifted by air to John Muir Medical Center and underwent surgery. The school, along with all other schools in the district, then went into lockdown later that morning. 19-year-old Yousuf Mohammad Aziz and another person were arrested in connection with the shooting. In 2011, Aziz was convicted of charges of premeditated attempted murder, assault with a firearm, shooting at an inhabited dwelling and two counts of street terrorism, and was sentenced to 7 years to life in prison.

2013 bomb threats

In April 2013, the school received continuous bomb threats in a single week, with evacuations held on an hourly basis due to safety concerns. These bomb threats were also sent out to Black Diamond Middle School as well, with these types of threats deemed "anonymous". It was later revealed that a 16 year old student was responsible for the bomb threats, and was arrested soon after. No one was hurt during those evacuation periods.

2020 shooting

On January 31, 2020, at around 8:30pm, a fight broke out in the parking lot of the school. A sixteen year old student, Jonathan Parker, was shot three times during a basketball game against cross-town rival Antioch High School. The teen later died from his injuries. The shooter, a student in Pittsburg CA, later turned himself in to the U.S. Marshal Service and the Oakland Police Department after hiding from authorities in Oakland, CA.

Notable alumni

 Taiwan Jones, running back for the Buffalo Bills, Oakland Raiders, Houston Texans
 Marcus Lee, power forward for the California Golden Bears
 Sterling Moore, cornerback for the New Orleans Saints
 Kevin Pereira, co-host of G4's Attack of the Show!
Nsimba Webster, class of 2014, wide receiver for the Los Angeles Rams 2019-Present
Elizabeth Soleyman, class of 2005, Founder and CEO of We Get It Foundation

References

External links

 
 ESPACEacademy.com
 Antioch Unified School District

Antioch, California
Educational institutions established in 1996
High schools in Contra Costa County, California
Public high schools in California
1996 establishments in California